There are two different kinds of Olympic weightlifting records in Malaysia and certified by the Malaysian Weightlifting Federation (MWF):
 National record, more commonly referred to in Malaysia as the rekod kebangsaan: the best result recorded anywhere in the world by a weightlifter or team holding Malaysian citizenship.
 Malaysian All-Comers record: the best result recorded within Malaysia by a weightlifter or team regardless of nationality.
Key to tables:

Legend: # – Record awaiting ratification by Malaysian Weightlifting Federation; WR – World record; AS – Asian record; CR – Commonwealth record

Current records

Men

Women

Historical records

Men (1998–2018)

Women (1998–2018)

Historical Malaysian All-Comers records

Men (1998–2018)

Women (1998–2018)

See also
Sukma Games records in Olympic weightlifting

References

External links
 List of Malaysian records in Olympic weightlifting as of 23 July 2016
 List of Sukan Malaysia records in Olympic weightlifting as of 23 July 2016

records
Malaysia
Olympic weightlifting
weightlifting